is a Japanese light novel series written by Kazuha Kishimoto and illustrated by 40hara. It was serialized online between March 2015 and December 2016 on the user-generated novel publishing website Shōsetsuka ni Narō, followed by nine epilogue chapters between February 2017 and October 2020. It was later acquired by Futabasha, who have published five volumes from October 2015 to July 2017 under their Monster Bunko imprint. A manga adaptation with art by Arashiyama has been serialized via Futabasha's digital publication Web Comic Action since June 2018. It has been collected in eight tankōbon volumes. An anime television series adaptation by Studio Elle is set to premiere in April 2023.

Characters

Media

Light novel
The series written by Kazuha Kishimoto was serialized online from March 2015 to December 2016 on the user-generated novel publishing website Shōsetsuka ni Narō. It was later acquired by Futabasha, who published the series as a light novel under their Monster Bunko imprint with illustrations by 40hara in five volumes from October 30, 2015 to July 29, 2017.

Manga
A manga adaptation with art by Arashiyama has been serialized via Futabasha's digital publication Web Comic Action since June 2018. It has been collected in eight tankōbon volumes as of August 2022. Coolmic is publishing the manga in English.

Anime
On October 26, 2021, an anime television series adaptation was announced. It will be produced by Studio Elle and directed by Motoki Nakanishi, with scripts written by Yukihito, character designs handled by Mikako Kunii, and music composed by Manzo. The series is set to premiere on April 9, 2023, on the  programming block on ABC and other networks. The opening theme song is "Continue Distortion" by S.S.NiRVERGE∀, while the ending theme song is "Be ambitious!!!" by Maybe Me.

References

External links
 at Shōsetsuka ni Narō 
 
 

2015 Japanese novels
2023 anime television series debuts
Anime and manga based on light novels
Futabasha manga
Isekai anime and manga
Isekai novels and light novels
Japanese webcomics
Light novels
Light novels first published online
Seinen manga
Shōsetsuka ni Narō
Upcoming anime television series
Webcomics in print